The College of Veterinary Medicine is a graduate school at the University of Illinois at Urbana–Champaign.

External links
College of Veterinary Medicine

Illinois
Veterinary Medicine